Crescentius the Elder (died 7 July 984) was a politician and aristocrat in Rome who played a part in the papal appointment.

Family
With the disappearance of the Carolingian dynasty the papal government of Rome lost its most powerful protector, and the Romans took matters into their own hands.
Out of the local aristocracy there arose a powerful family, which assumed the practical charge of all governmental affairs in Rome, controlled the nominations to the papal throne, and held the power for many years.

At the beginning of the tenth century the family was represented by Theophylact I, Count of Tusculum, vestararius or high dignitary of the papal palace and the pontifical government, by his wife Theodora, and their two daughters Marozia and Theodora. Theophylact had the titles of Consul and Senator of the Romans. Crescentius was a descendant of this family, being a grandson of Theophylact's daughter Theodora.

Pope Benedict VI
Crescentius ("Crescentius of the Marble Horse") was first mentioned as being one of the nobles who attended the Synod of Rome which deposed Pope John XII in 963, on the orders of the Holy Roman Emperor Otto I (936-73). His presence there signified that, at this point, Crescentius was aligned to the imperial party.

According to the records, he took an active hand in Roman affairs for the first time in 974. At the death of Pope John XIII (965-72), who was a brother of Crescentius, the emperor Otto I designated as his successor the Cardinal-Deacon Benedict, who took the name Benedict VI (972-74). The Romans bore the constant interference of the emperor in the papal elections with ill-concealed indignation.

About a year after the death of Otto I, when his successor Otto II (973-83) was engaged in wars at home, they rebelled against the imperial regime under the headship of Crescentius.

The unfortunate Pope Benedict VI was dethroned, thrown into the Castel Sant'Angelo, and strangled there in July, 974.

Pope Boniface VII
The deacon Franco, a Roman, son of Ferrucius, was chosen to succeed, and took the name of Boniface VII (974). The protests of the imperial envoy Sicco were of no avail against this manifestation of national aspirations on the part of the Romans. Soon, however, the imperial party gained the upper hand; Pope Boniface VII was forced to flee to Constantinople; Benedict VII (974-83) was chosen in his place, and Crescentius disappeared for a time.

In all likelihood Crescentius took an active part in the restoration of Boniface VII in 984.
After the death of the Emperor Otto II (December, 983) the anti-imperial party believed that the time had come for reasserting itself. In April, 984, Boniface VII returned from Constantinople and took possession of Rome. Pope John XIV (983-4), who had been appointed by the Emperor Otto II, was imprisoned in the Castel Sant'Angelo, where he perished about four months afterwards, and Boniface VII (984-5) ruled again as pope up to the time of his death in July, 985.

Later life
Towards the end of his life, whether before or after the restoration of Boniface VII is uncertain, Crescentius took the monastic habit in the monastery of St. Alexius on the Aventine, where he died, 7 July 984, and was buried within the cloister. The epitaph on his tomb (Armellini, Le Chiese di Roma, 586) is still visible.

See also
Crescentii
Counts of Tusculum

References

People of medieval Rome
984 deaths
Year of birth unknown
History of the papacy